James Colvin Rowe (born 23 July 1983) is an English football manager and former player. Until 2022, he was manager of the National League North club AFC Fylde.

Early life
Rowe, the son of former football manager Colwyn Rowe, was born and grew up in Ipswich, Suffolk, where he attended St Joseph's College. In his youth he played for Luton Town and Charlton Athletic.

Playing career
After being released by Charlton at age 18, Rowe joined Southern Football League Premier Division club Ilkeston Town. He subsequently joined Histon, where he scored 30 goals as an 18 year old, however, a serious knee injury interrupted Rowe's progress. In 2004, he joined Heybridge Swifts. Afterwards, he joined Stamford and Grantham Town for short spells, before signing with Rugby Town in July 2005. However, he left Rugby Town after three games by mutual consent, following being fined by the club for dissent. He subsequently returned to Histon, before joining Needham Market for the remainder of 2005–06. He signed with AFC Sudbury in 2006, where his father Colwyn and uncles Gary and Paul Barker previously played, remaining with them until the end of 2008.

In January 2009, he joined Leiston, where he scored 20 goals in his first 12 games. In July 2009, he joined Canvey Island. In 2010, he began working for Birmingham City in a part-time academy coaching role, which allowed him to continue to play, where he joined Leamington in 2010. He departed at the end of the season to work full-time with Birmingham. In 2013, following a gap in his playing career due to his coaching commitments, he rejoined former club Canvey Island, scoring once in four appearances.

Managerial career

Youth coaching
Rowe retired from playing at age 27, moving into coaching. He joined Birmingham City, as the academy's head of education and coach for the U16 and U17 teams. He stayed at Birmingham for three years, before joining the Premier League as a coaching advisor, where he was responsible for providing technical reports on Academy teams across England and Europe. Afterwards, he joined West Ham United as assistant academy manager.

In 2015, Rowe left West Ham after having been disciplined for "poor practice" regarding young players. Following an internal investigation caused by complaints, he was ordered to undertake awareness training. He went to Holland to attend the Johan Cruyff Institute in Amsterdam, where he earned a master's degree in coaching.

Aldershot Town (assistant)
In June 2016, Rowe was appointed assistant manager with National League club Aldershot Town under manager Gary Waddock., extending his contract a year later. Despite interest from League Two clubs, Waddock and Rowe remained at Aldershot, guiding the Shots to two successive play-off positions in 2016–17 and 2017–18.  Rowe left Aldershot in January 2019, by mutual consent.

Gloucester City
In November 2019, Rowe was appointed manager of sixth-tier National League North side Gloucester City, having been approached while at Aldershot 12 months earlier. After arriving at Gloucester, the team initially struggled before the season was shortly cancelled due to the COVID-19 pandemic. After making sweeping roster changes in the offseason and bringing in players whom he has previously worked with such as Akwasi Asante, they began the following season with an upset loss to ninth-tier Christchurch F.C. in the FA Cup on penalties, however, they were able to rebound quickly and began the 2020–21 National League North season with four consecutive league wins, equaling their best league start in 78 years, as well as eight wins through nine matches.

Chesterfield
In November 2020, he left Gloucester to become manager of fifth-tier National League club Chesterfield, signing a contract through the end of the 2022–23 season. In early 2021, his contract was extended through the summer of 2024, despite some interest from League Two clubs. On 12 April 2021, Rowe was awarded with the league's Manager of the Month award for the previous month as his side won six out of seven games, conceding zero goals in these wins. After joining the club while they were in 22nd place in the 23-team league through nine matches, Rowe ultimately guided Chesterfield to a sixth-place finish in his inaugural season, advancing to the promotion playoffs, but were defeated by Notts County. In October 2021, it was reported that Southend United made an official approach to recruit Rowe to become their new manager. Through his first 50 matches with Chesterfield, he led the club to a record of 30 wins, ten losses, and ten draws. In his first full year as manager, the club got 101 points from 50 league games. On 8 January 2022, Chesterfield played UEFA Champions League holders Chelsea in the third round of the FA Cup, with Chesterfield losing 5–1.

On 24 January 2022, Rowe was suspended by Chesterfield pending an investigation into allegations of misconduct, later disclosed as an allegation of sexual assault in November 2021. On 4 February 2022, Rowe departed Chesterfield by mutual consent.

AFC Fylde
On 7 March 2022, Rowe was appointed manager of National League North side AFC Fylde, signing a three-year contract. On 29 September, the club stated that Rowe had resigned. The previous day, he had been formally charged with one count of sexual assault in November 2021. Fylde stated that due diligence had been done before his appointment. In November 2022, Rowe pleaded not guilty to the charges, and is scheduled for trial on 4 December 2023.

Personal life
Rowe also holds a UEFA A Licence, and a Masters of Research Degree in Sports Science from Nottingham Trent University.

Managerial statistics

Honours

Manager
Individual
National League Manager of the Month: March 2021

References 

1983 births
Living people
English footballers
Association football forwards
English football managers
Luton Town F.C. players
Charlton Athletic F.C. players
Ilkeston Town F.C. players
Histon F.C. players
A.F.C. Sudbury players
Leiston F.C. players
Canvey Island F.C. players
Leamington F.C. players
Birmingham City F.C. non-playing staff
West Ham United F.C. non-playing staff
Aldershot Town F.C. non-playing staff
Gloucester City A.F.C. managers
National League (English football) managers
People educated at St Joseph's College, Ipswich
Association football coaches
Alumni of Nottingham Trent University
AFC Fylde managers